New Richmond  is an incorporated municipality in Quebec, Canada, situated on the southern coast of the Gaspé Peninsula between the municipalities of Maria and Caplan.

New Richmond is bounded on the west by the Grand Cascapedia River. The Little Cascapedia runs to the east of the town proper. In addition to New Richmond itself, the town's territory also includes the communities of Black Cape and Saint-Edgar.

History

The first European settlers arrived from Scotland in 1755. The first arrivals were the Duthie brothers, George and John Duthie and their families. Their descendants still reside in the area today. It is one of the very few remaining municipalities on the Gaspé which still has a relatively large English-speaking population. It was originally a centre of farming, logging, and shipbuilding.

Industry 
The town experienced considerable growth in the 1960s with the development of a linerboard paper mill by Bathurst paper, which became Consolidated Bathurst and after a number of name changes Smurfit Stone. Economic downturns in the region brought a reduction in mill operations and many residents left for other regions. In 2005 the mill completely shut down, leaving the town with no major industry.

There is a large wharf located to the east of the town. This was built to service cargo ships that would arrive to be loaded with kraft paper or bunker oil. It is now mainly recreational.

The town has a British Heritage Museum. There is a small shopping centre as well as an indoor swimming pool, a hockey arena, and a theatre.

Education 
There is an English-language school (New Richmond High School) located in the centre of town which serves now grades K-11. French-speaking children have their own school (Bois Vivant) and complete high school in the town of Carleton.

Demographics 

Mother tongue language (2021)

Notable People from New Richmond

 The Pride of New Richmond: Paul Willett, Hockey Player
 François Bourque (born 1984), alpine skier

See also
 List of cities in Quebec

References

Cities and towns in Quebec
Incorporated places in Gaspésie–Îles-de-la-Madeleine